The RD-263 (GRAU Index 15D117) is a liquid rocket engine, burning N2O4 and UDMH in the oxidizer rich staged combustion cycle. Four RD-263 engines form a propulsion module RD-264 (GRAU Index 15D119). For the R-36M KB Yuzhnoye only ordered the first stage propulsion to Energomash, instead of both stages, arguing that they were overworked with the RD-270 development. By April 1970 Yuzhnoye was getting the engine documentation. By the end of 1972 Energomash started to test fire the engines in its own test stand. And by September 1973 the engine was certified for flight. While the engine is out of production, the ICBM as well as the Dnepr remain operational as of 2015.

Versions 
The basic engine has been used for the
 RD-263 (GRAU Index: 15D117): Initial version used on the R-36M and R-36MUTTKh first stage (15А14 and 15A18).
 RD-268 (GRAU Index: 15D168): Variation used on the MR-UR-100 (15А15) and MR-UR-100UTTKh (15A16) first stage.
 RD-273 (AKA RD-263F): Improved version based on the RD-263F upgrade project. Version used on the R-36M2 (15A18M) and (15A18M2) first stage.

Modules 
Some of these engines were bundled into modules of multiple engines. The relevant modules and auxiliary engines are:
 RD-264 (GRAU Index 15D119): A module comprising four RD-263. Propulsion module of the R-36M and R-36MUTTKh first stage (15А14 and 15A18).
 RD-274 (GRAU Index ): A module comprising four RD-273. Propulsion module of the R-36M2 (15A18M) and (15A18M2) first stage.

See also

R-36M - ICBM for which this engine was originally developed.
Dnepr - launch vehicle that is a repurposed R-36MUTTKh.
LR-87, twin-chamber American rocket engine family used on the Titan series of US launch vehicles. 
Rocket engine using liquid fuel

References

External links 
 KbKhA official information on the engine. (Archived)
 Encyclopedia Astronautica information on the propulsion module. (Archived)

Rocket engines of the Soviet Union
Rocket engines using hypergolic propellant
Rocket engines using the staged combustion cycle
Energomash rocket engines
Yuzhmash rocket engines